Alf Wallace is a former Canadian international lawn bowler.

He competed in the singles at the 1986 Commonwealth Games in Edinburgh, Scotland. Four years later he won a silver medal for Canada when he was part of the pairs team at the 1990 Commonwealth Games in Auckland, New Zealand. His pairs partner was George Boxwell.

He won the triples bronze medal at the inaugural 1985 Asia Pacific Bowls Championships.

He is an eight times national champion spanning from 1981 to 2001.

References

Living people
Canadian male bowls players
Commonwealth Games medallists in lawn bowls
Commonwealth Games silver medallists for Canada
Bowls players at the 1986 Commonwealth Games
Bowls players at the 1990 Commonwealth Games
Year of birth missing (living people)
Medallists at the 1990 Commonwealth Games